Beaworthy is a village and civil parish in the West Devon district of Devon, England.  According to the 2001 census it had a population of 236.

Notable residents
 Henry Courtney Selous (b. Haymarket, London, 1803; d. Beaworthy, Devon, 24 September 1890), was an English artist, painter, illustrator and lithographer.

References

External links

Villages in the Borough of West Devon